Everybody's Golf 2, known in Japan as  and in North America as Hot Shots Golf 2, is the second game in the Everybody's Golf series and the second game released for PlayStation.

Reception

The game received favourable reviews according to the review aggregation website GameRankings. In Japan, Famitsu gave it a score of 34 out of 40.

Notes

References

External links
 

1999 video games
Golf video games
PlayStation (console) games
PlayStation (console)-only games
PlayStation Network games
Sony Interactive Entertainment games
Everybody's Golf
Video games developed in Japan